Johnny "John" Ferrell (born 28 February 1961 from Lewisham, London) is a former English professional darts player, who played in Professional Darts Corporation events.

Career
Ferrell making his debut on the 1997 World Matchplay, he defeating Paul Cook of England and losing Drew O'Neill of Scotland

Ferrell played in four stages World Matchplays between 1997 and 2000 with best run being to the Last 16, before losing to Ronnie Baxter of England.

Ferrell played in three PDC World Darts Championships between 1998 and 2000, with his best run being to the quarter-finals in 1999, before losing to Alan Warriner-Little. He also played in the 2002 BDO World Darts Championship, losing in the first round to Bob Taylor.

World Championship performances

BDO
 2002: Last 32: (lost to Bob Taylor 0–3)

PDC
 1998: Last 24 Group: (lost to Jamie Harvey 0–3 & lost to Rod Harrington 0–3)
 1999: Quarter-Finals: (lost to Alan Warriner-Little 1–4)
 2000: Last 32: (lost to John Part 0–3)

References

External links

1961 births
Living people
English darts players
Professional Darts Corporation former pro tour players